Alice Parker (born December 16, 1925) is an American composer, arranger, conductor, and teacher. She has authored five operas, eleven song-cycles, thirty-three cantatas, eleven works for chorus and orchestra, forty-seven choral suites, and more than forty hymns, all original compositions. Also to be noted are wealth of arrangements based on pre-existing folk-songs and hymns, many of which were produced in collaboration with Robert Shaw. Parker is best known for these kinds of arrangements of spirituals, mountain hymns, and folk songs, early-American hymns, and international folk-songs, most notably in French, Spanish, Hebrew, and Ladino.

Early life
Parker was born in Boston to Mary Stuart and Gordon Parker. She studied music theory with Mary Mason at the New England Conservatory, composition and conducting at Smith College and the Juilliard School, where she began her long and prolific association with Robert Shaw. The many Parker-Shaw settings of American folk songs, hymns, and spirituals form an enduring repertoire for choruses in many countries around the world.

Musical career 
Parker attended Smith College, graduating in 1947 with a double major in organ and composition. She went on to study choral conducting at Juilliard, then became a teacher while also collaborating with Robert Shaw on arrangements of materials to be recorded by the Robert Shaw Chorale, formed in 1948. Parker went on to become the primary arranger for the Robert Shaw Chorale for 20 years. On December 29, 1947, Alice was featured on the cover of Newsweek alongside other singers. The chorale disbanded in 1965.

In 1954, Parker married Thomas Pyle, a member of the Robert Shaw Chorale. They had five children. Pyle died unexpectedly in 1976, leaving her to care for their five children. She moved to western Massachusetts, and, in 1985, she founded Melodious Accord. The Musicians of Melodious Accord is a professional chorus that has released fourteen albums. The Melodious Accord Fellowship Program brings young mid-career musicians from all over the world to study with Parker.

She has composed over 500 pieces of music, including operas, song cycles, cantatas, choral suites, and anthems.

Honors and awards 

Parker served on the Board of Directors of Chorus America. She was their first Director Laureate. Among her many awards, Parker has received the Distinguished Composer of the Year 2000 by the American Guild of Organists, the 2014 Brock Commission from the American Choral Directors Association, the Harvard Glee Club Foundation Medal in 2015, six honorary doctorates, and the Smith College Medal. Parker is a Fellow of the Hymn Society of the United States and Canada. She has been awarded grants from ASCAP, the National Endowment for the Arts, the Aaron Copland Fund for Music, and the American Music Center. Most recently she was honored by the International Emily Dickinson Society for her choral suite Heavenly Hurt.

To celebrate Parker's 90th birthday in 2015, choral groups worldwide posted performances of her work on YouTube, as part of a project called Alice Is 90.

Film 
The 2020 documentary Alice: At Home With Alice Parker by Eduardo Montes-Bradley, explores the life and works of Parker. It was filmed over the winter of 2020 at her residence in Hawley and in New York City. Produced by HFP in association with Melodious Accord, Inc., the film focuses particularly on the formative years and in the collaborations of Parker with the written works of Martin Luther King Jr., Archibald MacLeish, Eudora Welty and Emily Dickinson. Alice'''s American premiere was on October 8, 2020, by Chorus America, it was selected to be in the Official Selection, 2020 at the Virginia Film Festival. Grand Jury Award, Mystic Film Festival, 2021. Distributed by Kanopy.Internet Movie Database

 Arrangements and recordings 

(1951–1962 in collaboration with Robert Shaw; Robert Shaw Chorale)

1951 A Treasury of Easter Songs (13 arr.) RCA Victor	
1952 Christmas Hymns and Carols Vol. II(22 arr.) RCA Victor	
1954 With Love from a Chorus (9 arr.) RCA Victor
1956 My True Love Sings(15 arr.)RCA Victor
1957 Christmas Hymns and Carols Vol. I(17 arr.)RCA Victor  	
1958 A Mighty Fortress (6 arr.) RCA Victor  
1959 Stephen Foster Song Book(16 arr.)RCA Victor  
1960 A Chorus of Love (15 arr.) RCA Victor 
1960 What Wondrous Love(18 arr.) RCA Victor  
1961 Deep River (2 arr.) RCA Victor
1961 How Far Is It to Bethlehem (SATB – Four-part Chorus of Mixed Voices, a cappella). By Alice Parker and Robert Shaw and Words by Frances Chesterton.
1961 Sea Shanties (16 arr.) RCA Victor   
1962 I'm Goin’ to Sing (16 arr.) RCA Victor
 1964 Music Reference Crammer 1965 Hymns and Carols. By Robert Shaw and Alice Parker. Twenty-one sacred songs from traditional hymns and carols, and folk hymns and spirituals. Among the composers are Joseph Hayden, Louis Bourgeois, William Billings; among the poets are William Kethe, Isaac Watts, John Newton. Paperback. 105 pages. Publisher: Lawson-Gould Music Publishers, Inc. (Warner/Chappell); 1st edition (1965), A Robert Shaw Collection.

(Alice Parker Arrangements for Robert Shaw Chorale)

1965 Sing to the Lord (16 arr.) RCA Victor  
1967 Irish Folk Songs (16 arr.) RCA Victor

(Alice Parker Compositions with Lucy Shelton and Manhattan String Quartet – Musical Heritage)

1984 Songs for Eve (Archibald MacLeish) 
1984 Echoes from the Hills (Emily Dickinson)
2006 Songs for Eve (Archibald MacLeish). Recorded in Episcopal Church of the Holy Trinity, NYC, 1983

(Other Works)

1971  The Martyrs' Mirror. Opera. Composer: Alice Parker. Librettist-Literary Source: John L. Ruth
1975 Songs For Eve. Music by Alice Parker, literary source: a poem by Archibald MacLeish. Publisher: Ocean, New Jersey: Musical Heritage Society, 1985. 72 minutes. 
1976 The Family Reunion. A Back-Yard Opera in One Act. Libretto and Music by Alice Parker. Publisher: Melodious Accord. 
1976 Creative Hymn Singing 
1978  Singers Glen. (Opéra Bouffe). An opera in a Prologue and Two Acts. Composer: Alice Parker. Librettist-Literary Source: Alice Parker. Place: A Homestead in the Shenandoah Valley known as Singers Glen. Character: Joseph Funk, his children, The Bishop, Aunt Martha, Susan Ruebush, Jacob Baer, and other children. Premiered on April 1, 1978. Directed by Hiram Hershey.    
1982 Listen, Lord. A Cantata, Two Suites, and Five Spirituals in choral settings by Alice Parker. Gothic Records. Cat. G 49219. Recorded with The Musicians of Melodic Accord. Alice Parker, conductor. Pamela-Warrick-Smith, contralto.
1982 The Ponder Heart. Opera. Composer: Alice Parker. Librettist-Literary Source: Alice Parker and Eudora Welty. Premiered in Jackson, Mississippi.
 1985 Folk Song Transformation 1985–1988 Sacred Symphonies. The Musicians of Melodious Accord; Alice Parker, conductor. Recorded at the Church of the Holy Trinity, New York City, September 29 and 30, 1985. Engineering: David Hancock. Published CD, 1988 Amreco, Inc; Copyrighted by Musical Heritage Society. 
1989 Spiritual Songs – Musical Heritage – Recorded in the Church of the Holy Trinity, NYC, 1988
1991 Transformations – Musical Heritage – Recorded in the Episcopal Church of the Holy Trinity, NYC, 1990
1991 Melodious Accord: Good Singing in Church1991 The Shaw-parker Book of Christmas Carols: Twenty-four Collected Carols for Unaccompanied Mixed Chorus. With Robert Shaw. Paperback.176 pages. Publisher: Hal Leonard. . 
1994 Take Me to the Water. Thirteen New Spiritual Arrangements. Pamela Warrick-Smith, contralto; The Musicians of Melodic Accord; Alice Parker, conductor. GIA Publications, Inc. CD-329. Recorded in Chapel of Riverside Church, NYC, 1994 
1999 Sweet Manna – GIA – Recorded at the Church of the Resurrection, NYC, 1998
2003 My Love and I. The Men of The Musicians of Melodious Accord Conducted by Alice Parker. Love songs arrange for a chorus of men including compositions from America, England, Scotland, France, Czech Republic, Germany, Spain, Ireland, and the United States. The recording was partially supported by a grant from the National Endowment for the Arts. Music published by Lawson-Gould, Inc. Gothic Records. G 49213
2004 Listen, Lord – Gothic Records – Recorded in Middle Collegiate Church, NYC, 2003
2005 O Sing the Glories. Alice Parker and the Musicians of Melodious Accord. Seventeen Anthems Composed and Arranged by Alice Parker. GIA Publications, Inc. CD-633
2007 Anatomy of Melody: Exploring the Single Line of Song. Hardcover. 216 pages. Publisher GIA Publications. .Dimensions: 6 x 0.7 x 9 inches  
2007 Family Reunion – Melodious Accord – Recorded in James Chapel, Union Theological Seminary, 2003
2007 Hand-Me-Down Songs. Folksongs for children from the American tradition. Researched and arranged by Alice Parker. Produced by James Heiks. Gia Publications, Inc. Includes such tunes as Michael, Row The Boat Ashore, Old Dan Tucker, She'll Be Coming 'Round The Mountain, and others.
2008 Angels and Challengers – Melodious Accord – Recorded at Union Theological Seminary, NYC, 2001
2009 Singers Glen – Melodious Accord – Recorded at the Academy of Arts and Letters, NYC, 2007
2010 Saints Bound for Heaven – Melodious Accord – Recorded in Park Avenue Christian Church, 
2009 Singers Glen – Melodious Accord – Recorded at the Academy of Arts and Letters, NYC, 2007
2010 The Ponder Heart – Melodious Accord archival DVD – Recorded in the Federated Church Charlemont, MA, 2010
2011 Transformations – re-released by Melodious Accord – Recorded in Episcopal Church of the Holy Trinity, NYC, 1990
2012 And Glory Shone – Melodious Accord – Recorded in Park Avenue Christian Church, NYC, 2012
2014 Where Heart and Heaven Meet – GIA – Hymns from Melodious Accord Hymnal – Recorded at Avatar Studios, NYC, 2014
2010 The Melodious Accord Hymnal Paperback. 194 pages. Publisher: GIA Music. 
2013 Melodious Accord: Good Singing in Church Paperback. 114 pages. Publisher: Gia Publications, Inc. . 
2014 The Answering Voice: The Beginning of Counterpoint. Hardcover. 128 pages. Publisher: Gia Publications, Inc. . 
 2016 Alice Parker's Hand-Me-Down Ballads. co-author James Heiks. 56 pages. Publisher: Gia Publications, Inc. .  
 2017 Heavenly Hurt: Songs of Love and Loss. Poems by Emily Dickinson. Seven songs for mixed chorus with cello and piano. Eugene Friesen, cello; Paul Vasile, piano. Commissioned by Da Camera Singers of Amherst, MA, Sheila L. Heffernon, conductor; first performance May 29, 2013, in Charlemont, Amherst, and Northhampton. The Gothic Catalog. Number: G-49310.
 2019 The Melodic Voice: Conversations with Alice Parker.'' By Cameron LaBarr and John Wykoff. Hardcover, 345 pages. GIA Publications. The book includes access to more than three hours of video interviews with Alice Parker.

References

External links 
 Alice Parker's official homepage
Alice Parker papers, Special Collections in Performing Arts, University of Maryland Libraries

Living people
American women music educators
1925 births
American women classical composers
American classical composers
Musicians from Boston
Smith College alumni
Juilliard School alumni
Women conductors (music)
Classical musicians from Massachusetts
21st-century American conductors (music)
20th-century American conductors (music)
21st-century American women musicians
20th-century American women musicians
American women hymnwriters